Ashcroft station is on the Canadian National Railway mainline in Ashcroft, British Columbia, Canada.  There is no actual building or place of shelter - VIA Rail says the station type is "signpost".  The stopping point is located on the north side of the Thompson River (in North Ashcroft, opposite the main Ashcroft town site).  The station is served by Via Rail's The Canadian as a flag stop (48-hour advance notice required).

References 

Via Rail stations in British Columbia